Anna Sergeevna Samoylik  (born August 28 1995) is a Russian curler. She competes in mixed doubles curling on the World Curling Tour with teammate Mikhail Vaskov.

Samoylik played on the Russian Team at the 2019 Winter Universiade, in her hometown of Krasnoyarsk. As the alternate on the team skipped by Uliana Vasileva, she only saw ice time in one game, against Switzerland. The team took home the bronze medal.

On the World Curling Tour, she and partner Mikhail Vaskov won the 2021 MD Moscow Classic, and have been runners up at the 2021 WCT Arctic Cup, Sirius Cup and Pacific Cup Vladivostok. She was also the runner-up at the 2019 WCT Dutch Masters Mixed Doubles with partner Vasily Groshev.

Personal life
Samoylik is also a top golfer in the Krasnoyarsk Krai. Her father introduced curling to the region. She lived in Norilsk for one year as a child. She married Pavel Samoylik in 2020.

References

External links

Living people
1995 births
Russian female curlers
Russian female golfers
Sportspeople from Krasnoyarsk
People from Norilsk
Universiade medalists in curling
Universiade bronze medalists for Russia
Competitors at the 2019 Winter Universiade